Siege of Ypres may refer to:
Siege of Ypres (1383), during Despenser's Crusade
Siege of Ypres (1583–1584), during the Eighty Years' War
Siege of Ypres (1658), after the Battle of the Dunes (1658)
Siege of Ypres (1678), during the Franco-Dutch War
Siege of Ypres (1709), before the Battle of Malplaquet
Siege of Ypres (1744), during the War of the Austrian Succession
Siege of Ypres (1794), during the Flanders Campaign

See also
Battle of Ypres, a list of battles from 1914–1918